Matthewson is a patronymic surname, meaning "son of Matthew". Notable people with the surname include:

Bob Matthewson (died 2000), English footballer and referee
Clive Matthewson (born 1944), New Zealand politician
Dale Matthewson (1923–1984), American baseball player
Reg Matthewson (born 1939), English footballer
Trevor Matthewson (born 1963), English footballer

See also
Mathewson

Patronymic surnames